In Greek mythology, Eurynome (Ancient Greek: Εὐρυνόμη, from , eurys, "broad" and , nomos, "pasture" or  "law") or Eurymede was a Megarian princess who became a queen of Corinth.

Family 
Eurynome was the daughter of King Nisus of Megara and possibly, Abrota of Onchestus, thus sister to Scylla and Iphinoe. She became the mother of the hero Bellerophon by Poseidon even if she was wed to the Corinthian king Glaucus. By the latter, Eurynome probably bore Deliades (Alcimenes or Piren) who was killed by his own brother Bellerophon.

Mythology 

According to the Hesiodic Catalogue of Women, Athena herself taught the girl handiwork. Sisyphus attempted to drive away her cattle, but ended up winning her as bride for his son Glaucus by the will of Athena. But Zeus had ordained that Sisyphus would not leave behind any progeny, and Eurynome lay instead with Poseidon, giving birth to Bellerophon.

Hesiod's account 
Eurynome the daughter of Nisus, Pandion's son, to whom Pallas Athene taught all her art, both wit and wisdom too; for she was as wise as the gods. A marvellous scent rose from her silver raiment as she moved, and beauty was wafted from her eyes. Her, then, Glaucus sought to win by Athena's advising, and he drove oxen for her. But he knew not at all the intent of Zeus who holds the aegis.

Notes

Princesses in Greek mythology
Queens in Greek mythology
Women of Poseidon
Mortal parents of demigods in classical mythology
Megarian characters in Greek mythology

References 

 Apollodorus, The Library with an English Translation by Sir James George Frazer, F.B.A., F.R.S. in 2 Volumes, Cambridge, MA, Harvard University Press; London, William Heinemann Ltd. 1921. . Online version at the Perseus Digital Library. Greek text available from the same website.
Gaius Julius Hyginus, Fabulae from The Myths of Hyginus translated and edited by Mary Grant. University of Kansas Publications in Humanistic Studies. Online version at the Topos Text Project.
 Hesiod, Catalogue of Women from Homeric Hymns, Epic Cycle, Homerica translated by Evelyn-White, H G. Loeb Classical Library Volume 57. London: William Heinemann, 1914. Online version at theio.com
Lucius Mestrius Plutarchus, Moralia with an English Translation by Frank Cole Babbitt. Cambridge, MA. Harvard University Press. London. William Heinemann Ltd. 1936. Online version at the Perseus Digital Library. Greek text available from the same website.
Pausanias, Description of Greece with an English Translation by W.H.S. Jones, Litt.D., and H.A. Ormerod, M.A., in 4 Volumes. Cambridge, MA, Harvard University Press; London, William Heinemann Ltd. 1918. . Online version at the Perseus Digital Library
Pausanias, Graeciae Descriptio. 3 vols. Leipzig, Teubner. 1903.  Greek text available at the Perseus Digital Library.

Corinthian mythology